Pierre Le Mellec (born 3 August 1940) is a French former racing cyclist. He rode in the 1964 Tour de France.

Major results
1963
 2nd GP Ouest–France
 2nd Circuit de l'Aulne
1964
 1st Stage 3b Critérium du Dauphiné Libéré
1965
 2nd Côte Normande
 3rd Grand Prix d'Aix-en-Provence
1966
 3rd GP Ouest–France

References

1940 births
Living people
French male cyclists